The Philadelphia Phoenix is a professional ultimate team based in Philadelphia, Pennsylvania, and a member of the East Division of the American Ultimate Disc League (AUDL). The Phoenix are currently owned and operated by Main Line Today's "Woman on The Move" Christina Lee Chung, MD, FAAD. From 2020 to 2021 the team competed in the Atlantic Division. The Phoenix home field is the South Philadelphia Supersite, located in Philadelphia, Pennsylvania.

References

Ultimate (sport) teams
2013 establishments in Pennsylvania
Ultimate teams established in 2013
Sports teams in Philadelphia